Petalidium, commonly known as petal-bushes, is a genus of perennial shrubs in the acanthus family. They are native to sandy flats or stony slopes in the drier bush regions of Africa, India and the Mascarene Islands. The majority of species occur in  frost-free, summer rainfall regions of southern Africa, and may be found from low to medium altitudes.

Description
They have a diverse habit, forming either small, scrambling herbs or large, robust shrubs. Their dilated, tubular flowers are solitary or on short racemes growing from the leaf axils, and vary from white to mauve or red in colour. The four stamens are partially fused with the corolla, and the style is branched into two unequal parts. The calyx is deeply divided into five segments.

Two large, ovate to elliptic bracteoles subtend and protect the young corolla. The persistent bracteoles may be conspicuously veined or covered by long, villous trichomes. The small, ellipsoid fruit capsules explosively release two to four flat seeds (two ovules per ovary cell) when moisture is absorbed by their hygroscopic hairs. Young foliage and branches are covered in gland-tipped hairs. The leaves are entire.

Cultivation
Some species are cultivated as ornamentals, as they grow fast and flower profusely.

Etymology
According to Jackson (1990), the name Petalidium is derived from the Greek petalon (a leaf or petal), which may refer to the deciduous, leaf-like bracts, while bracteatum likewise refers to the large, imbricate (i.e. overlapping) bracts.

Species
There are more than 30 species in all, of which 29 occur in southern Africa. The species include:
 Petalidium angustitubum P.G. Mey.
 Petalidium aromaticum Oberm. – n South Africa, s Zimbabwe
 Petalidium barlerioides (Roth) Nees
 Petalidium bracteatum Oberm. –  s Angola?, n & c Namibia
 Petalidium canescens C.B. Clarke
 Petalidium cirrhiferum S.Moore
 Petalidium coccineum S.Moore – nw Namibia
 Petalidium crispum A. Meeuse ex P.G. Mey.
 Petalidium currorii S.Moore – Angola
 Petalidium cymbiforme Schinz
 Petalidium giessii P.G. Mey.
 Petalidium glandulosum S.Moore
 Petalidium gossweileri S.Moore 	
 Petalidium halimoides (Nees) S.Moore – Namibia
 Petalidium huillense C.B.Clarke 	
 Petalidium lanatum C.B. Clarke 	
 Petalidium lepidagathis S.Moore 
 Petalidium linifolium T. Anderson 	
 Petalidium lucens Oberm. 	
 Petalidium luteo-album A. Meeuse 	
 Petalidium oblongifolium C.B. Clarke – South Africa 	
 Petalidium ohopohense P.G. Mey. 	
 Petalidium physaloides S.Moore – Namibia
 Petalidium pilosi-bracteolatum Merxm. & Hainz – Namibia
 Petalidium ramulosum Schinz 	
 Petalidium rautanenii Schinz 	
 Petalidium rossmannianum P.G. Mey. 	
 Petalidium rupestre S.Moore 	
 Petalidium setosum C.B. Clarke ex Schinz – n, c & s Namibia
 Petalidium spiniferum C.B.Clarke – Chella Mountains, Angola
 Petalidium subcrispum P.G. Mey.
 Petalidium tomentosum S.Moore 	
 Petalidium variabile C. B. Cl. Hybrid 	
 Petalidium welwitschii S.Moore

References

External links
 Petalidium Nees, Flora of Tropical Africa, Kew, Global Plants

 
Acanthaceae genera